The  in Higashiosaka is the oldest rugby union stadium in Japan specifically dedicated to rugby. Its location is next to Hanazono Central Park (花園中央公園, Hanazono Chūō Kōen). Owned by the City of Higashiosaka, it opened in 1929 with a capacity of 27,346. It is the stage for the annual National High School Rugby Tournament held every year at the end of December and has hosted important international, Top League games.

Hanazono is the home of the Kintetsu Liners rugby union team and J. League club, FC Osaka.

The stadium was selected as one of the venues for 2019 Rugby World Cup (Japan) which was the first Rugby World Cup to be held in Asia.

World record
On May 14, 2006 Daisuke Ohata broke the record for the most overall tries in test matches at Hanazono with a hat-trick for Japan against Georgia. The previous record holder was David Campese.

Football
It hosted the J1 League game between Cerezo Osaka and Nagoya Grampus Eight played there on May 8, 1999.

FC Osaka hosted stadium in J3 League on 18 march 2023 against relegated team from J2 in last season Iwate Grulla Morioka after full calendar of J3 match in 20 January 2023.

Renovation
The stadium underwent a large scale renovation during 2017-18 to increase facilities in preparation for the Rugby World Cup. On 26 October 2018, Hanazono hosted an international fixture between Japan national rugby union team and World XV in celebration of the completion.

2019 Rugby World Cup matches

See also

Chichibunomiya Rugby Stadium
Level-5 stadium
National Stadium (Tokyo, 1958)
J.League
Japan national rugby union team
Top League
2007–08 Top League
Higashi-Hanazono Station – Kintetsu Nara Line

References

External links
  Stadium website

Sports venues in Osaka Prefecture
Rugby union stadiums in Japan
Football venues in Japan
Rugby in Kansai
1929 establishments in Japan
Sports venues completed in 1929
Higashiōsaka
Kintetsu Group Holdings